Stape is the surname of the following people:

People
John Stape, a fictional character from the soap opera Coronation Street
William N. Stape, American screenwriter

Characters
 Fiona Stape, character Coronation Street, first appearing in 2001
 Hope Stape, character Coronation Street, first appearing in 2010